Suleiman Court was the first high-rise apartment building in Kuala Lumpur, Malaysia. The building was constructed at the direction of Malaysia's first Prime Minister, Tunku Abdul Rahman, who intended the Courts to provide affordable housing. The Courts was named after Suleiman bin Abdul Rahman, then incumbent Minister of Interior & Justice, who had watched over the progress of the Housing Trust for 8 years since its inception.

The Courts were built in 1957, as the Federation of Malaya neared official independence from the United Kingdom. Tunku Abdul Rahman had hoped for the building to be not just complete, but already occupied, in time for Hari Merdeka (the official proclamation of independence) on 31 August; however, the first apartments were not occupied until February 1958.

The three blocks of the Courts (Block A, Block B, and Block C) were located on Batu Road (now Jalan Tuanku Abdul Rahman), and had 295 apartments between them. They were demolished in 1986, to make room for the Sogo shopping complex.

References
 200 former residents of Suleiman Court reminisce at gathering - The Star 21 August 2007

External links
 Suleiman Courts Residents website

Buildings and structures in Kuala Lumpur
Residential skyscrapers in Malaysia
Skyscrapers in Kuala Lumpur
Demolished buildings and structures in Malaysia
Buildings and structures demolished in 1986
Buildings and structures completed in 1958
20th-century architecture in Malaysia